Zonites santoriniensis is an extinct species of air-breathing land snail, a terrestrial pulmonate gastropod mollusk in the family Zonitidae. 

Zonites santoriniensis is considered to be extinct. It went extinct during the Minoan Eruption.

Distribution
This species was endemic to Cyclades Islands, Greece.

References

External links
 

S
Extinct gastropods
Endemic fauna of Greece
Molluscs of Europe
Molluscs of the Mediterranean Sea
Extinct invertebrates since 1500
Gastropods described in 1987